Carcharhinus humani, also known as the Human's whaler shark, is a species of requiem shark, in the family Carcharhinidae. It inhabits the western Indian Ocean near the Socotra Islands, off Kuwait, Mozambique, and South Africa.

References

External links
http://shark-references.com/species/view/Carcharhinus-humani
https://www.fishbase.se/summary/67430

humani
Marine fauna of Western Asia
Marine fauna of East Africa
Fish described in 2014